Cybersoft Technologies, Inc. is a software company that makes software for School Nutrition or Food Service departments in K-12 school districts in the United States. The company has its headquarters along Cypress Creek Parkway in Harris County, Houston, Texas.

The company's customers include West Virginia Department of Education, Houston Independent School District, Buffalo Public Schools, Oklahoma City Public Schools and Fortune 1000 corporations. Cybersoft is a Microsoft Gold Certified Partner.

History
Cybersoft was founded by Charlie Yalamanchili, an entrepreneur who also founded CNC Investments, a highly successful commercial real estate investment company that was launched in 1982. CNC has grown from a humble beginning into the third largest property management firm in Houston, Texas. CNC has assets valued in excess of $1.5 billion, employs over 900 people, and spans over 6 states including New Mexico, Arizona, Texas, Florida, Georgia, and Oklahoma.

Cybersoft invented a system,  PrimeroEdge, formerly Primero Food Service Solutions, that serves as a pre-paid school cafeteria meal system, so children in cafeterias do not have to have cash on their person as they pay for their meals.

References

External links
 Cybersoft Website
 PrimeroEdge Website

Software companies based in Texas
Companies based in Harris County, Texas
Software companies established in 1998
Software companies of the United States